Levent Kazak (born 5 May 1967) is a Turkish screenwriter and actor.

Biography
Levent Kazak was born in Ankara in 1967. He finished Beşiktaş Atatürk High School in 1985. He studied at several universities such as Boğaziçi University (English Language and Literature Department), Mimar Sinan University (Painting Department, Sculpture Department and the Department of Theater Decoration and Costume), Marmara University Conservatory (Theater Department) and Istanbul University (Italian Language and Literature Department and Greek Language and Literature Department). In 1986, Kazak began performing in theater professionally. He has performed on over thirty stages with famous actors like Altan Erbulak, Ali Poyrazoğlu, Alpay İzer, Bülent Kayabaş, Savaş Dinçel and İsmet Ay. In addition, Kazak has written scenarios, translated and adapted scripts. In 1989, he prepared a TV drama “Kim Bunlar” with Peker Açıkalın, Nilüfer Açıkalın, Pelinsu Pir, and Levent Tülek. Kazak has also written scenarios for Children’s theaters and TV programs. In 2000, he wrote scenarios for films such as “O Şimdi Asker” (2000), “Neredesin Firuze” (2002) and “O Şimdi Mahkum” (2003). In 2005, Kazak wrote scenario for the film “Hacivat Karagöz Neden Öldürüldü”. He won the best scenarist with this film in the 13th Altın Koza Film Festival. Kazak is one of the founders of the Senaryo Stüdyosu.

Works
Films as a screenwriter
 O Şimdi Asker, 2003 
 Neredesin Firuze, 2004 
 O Şimdi Mahkum, 2005 
 Hacivat Karagöz Neden Öldürüldü, 2006

Films as an actor
 Yolun Sonundaki Karanlık, 1985 
 Hemşo, 1999 
 O Şimdi Asker, 2002 
 O Şimdi Mahkum, 2003 
 Hacivat Karagöz Neden Öldürüldü, 2005

Theater as an actor / screenwriter / translator
 Aş Bunları Aş, 1985 
 Hamam (Steaming), 1987 
 Hoşçakal İstanbul, 1988 
 Seçimler, 1989 
 Dünyalar, 1990 
 Sevimli Hayalet Pufidik 
 Babam 9 Doğurdu, 1991 
 Çehov Yalta′da, 1992 
 Kelebekler Özgürdür, 1993 
 Çılgınlar Klübü, 1990

TV dramas as an actor / scenarist / director
 Kim Bunlar TRT, 1988 
 Bol Bol Futbol TRT, 1990 
 Gülen Ayva Ağlayan Nar Star, 1992

External links 
 

1967 births
Living people
Turkish people of Circassian descent
Turkish male screenwriters
Best Screenplay Golden Boll Award winners
Turkish male film actors
Turkish male stage actors
Turkish male television actors
Male actors from Ankara
Boğaziçi University alumni